Albert Husson (3 August 1912 – 16 December 1978) was a French playwright and theatre director.

On 26 January 1968, Jean Meyer and Albert Husson were both appointed directors of the Théâtre des Célestins in Lyon, which produced numerous adaptations for the theater as well as television. Albert Husson, former secretary general of the Théâtre des Célestins 1944–1959, was specifically responsible for the administrative management, while John Meyer was artistic director.

Albert Husson was a member of the Académie des Sciences, Belles-Lettres et Arts de Lyon.

Comedian 
 1936: Romance by Robert de Flers and Francis de Croisset after Edward Sheldon, Théâtre des Célestins 
 1937: The Merry Widow by Robert de Flers and Gaston Arman de Caillavet, music by Franz Lehár, Théâtre des Célestins

Works

Adaptator 
 1959: La Copie de Madame Aupic after Gian-Carlo Menotti, directed by Daniel Ceccaldi, Théâtre Fontaine, Théâtre des Célestins
 1963: La Crécelle by Charles dyer, directed by Michel Fagadau, Théâtre de la Gaîté-Montparnasse 
 1965: Liola by Luigi Pirandello, directed by Bernard Jenny, Théâtre du Vieux-Colombier
 1965: Le Mal de Test by Ira Wallach, directed by Pierre Dux, Comédie des Champs-Élysées
 1965: Le Jour de la tortue by Pietro Garinei and Sandro Giovannini, directed by the authors and Robert Manuel, Théâtre Marigny
 1966:  : L'homme qui a perdu son ombre after the tale Peter Schlemihl by Adelbert von Chamisso, TV director Marcel Cravenne, first broadcast: 16/07/1966
 1966: Comment naît un scénario de cinéma by Cesare Zavattini, adaptation with Hubert Gignoux, directed by Hubert Gignoux, Théâtre de l'Athénée
 1968: Adieu Berthe by Allen Boretz and John Murray, adaptation with Francis Blanche, directed by Jacques Charon, Théâtre des Bouffes Parisiens
 1968: Le Soldat inconnu et sa femme by Peter Ustinov, directed by the author, Théâtre des Célestins
 1969: Le monde est ce qu'il est by Alberto Moravia, directed by Pierre Franck, Théâtre des Célestins, Théâtre de l'Œuvre
 1969: Cash-Cash by Alistair Foot and Anthony Marriott, directed by Michel Vocoret, Théâtre Fontaine 
 1971: Le Dieu Kurt by Alberto Moravia, directed by Pierre Franck, Théâtre des Célestins, Théâtre Michel
 1971: Joyeuse Pomme by Jack Pulman, directed by Jacques Rosny, Théâtre des Célestins
 1975: Un mois à la campagne by Ivan Turgenev, directed by Jean Meyer, Théâtre des Célestins
 1976: Hedda Gabler by Henrik Ibsen, directed by Jean Meyer, Théâtre des Célestins
 1976: Qui est qui ? by Keith Waterhouse and Willis Hall, Théâtre Moderne
 1978: Le Colonel Chabert after Honoré de Balzac, directed by Jean Meyer, Théâtre des Célestins
 1984: La Mal de test by Ira Wallach, directed by Raymond Gérôme, Comédie des Champs-Élysées  
 1987: Drôle de couple by Neil Simon, directed by Jean-Luc Moreau, Théâtre des Célestins

Author 
 1943: L'Immortel Saint-Germainchance, directed by Charles Gantillon, Théâtre des Célestins
 1947: Monsieur Providence, play in 2 acts and one prologue, Théâtre Gramont
 1948: Jardin français dialogues, directed by Julien Bertheau, Théâtre des Célestins
 1948: La Ligne de chance, directed by Charles Gantillon, Théâtre des Célestins
 1952: La Cuisine des anges, directed by Christian-Gérard, Théâtre du Vieux-Colombier (Film We're No Angels, 1955)
 1953: Les Pavés du ciel, directed by Christian-Gérard, Théâtre des Célestins
 1956: La Nuit du 4 août, directed by Christian-Gérard, Théâtre Édouard VII
 1956: L'Ombre du cavalier, directed by Julien Bertheau, Théâtre des Célestins
 1957: Les Pigeons de Venise, directed by Louis Ducreux, Théâtre des Célestins, Théâtre Michel
 1958: La Grande Revue du bimillénaire, in collaboration with Jacques Bodoin, Erge, R. Moreau, Xavier Salomon, Berier, Migy, André Marcel, Théâtre des Célestins
 1958: Une leçon de chant, one-act play, directed by Charles Gantillon, Théâtre des Célestins 
 1958: Le Valet de quatre cœurs after Servitore de due padroni by Carlo Goldoni, directed by Charles Gantillon, Théâtre des Célestins
 1961: L'Impromptu des collines, directed by Julien Bertheau, Théâtre du Tertre, Théâtre des Célestins
 1961: Claude de Lyon, directed by Julien Bertheau, Théâtre du Tertre, Théâtre des Célestins
 1963: Le Système Fabrizzi, directed by Sacha Pitoëff, Théâtre Moderne
 1963: Le Théâtre de la jeunesse: La Surprenante Invention du Professeur Delalune, TV director Marcel Cravenne, première diffusion : 30/11/1963
 1964: Devant que les chandelles…, Théâtre des Célestins
 1965: Le Théâtre de la jeunesse: Sans-souci ou Le Chef-d'œuvre de Vaucanson, TV director Jean-Pierre Decourt, first broadcast 22 May 1965
 1966: La Bouteille à l'encre, directed by Jean-Pierre Grenier, Théâtre Saint-Georges
 1969: La Paille humide, directed by Michel Roux, Théâtre de la Michodière
 1972: Le Plaisir conjugal after Lysistrata by Aristophane, Théâtre de la Madeleine 
 1973: Le Paysan parvenu after Marivaux, directed by Jean Meyer, Théâtre des Célestins  
 1974: Bonne Fête Amandine, directed by Jacques Mauclair, Théâtre des Célestins

Artistic collaboration  
 1978: Boule de Suif after Guy de Maupassant, directed by Jean Meyer, Théâtre des Célestins

Prizes and honours 
 1947: Grand Prix de la Société des Auteurs for Monsieur Providence

External links 
 

20th-century French dramatists and playwrights
French theatre managers and producers
Writers from Lyon
1912 births
1978 deaths